Limnaecia ensigera is a moth in the family Cosmopterigidae. It is found in New Guinea.

References

Natural History Museum Lepidoptera generic names catalog

Limnaecia
Moths of New Guinea
Moths described in 1954
Taxa named by Alexey Diakonoff